Todd Larkham (born 13 October 1974) is a former professional tennis player from Australia. He is the younger brother of Brent Larkham, a former player who coached him towards the end of his career.

Career
Larkham twice made the second round of a Grand Slam singles draw, both times as a qualifier. His first victory came against Ctislav Doseděl at the 1997 Wimbledon Championships, in four sets, after losing the first. In the 2003 Australian Open he defeated Cecil Mamiit to set up a second round meeting with tournament favourite Lleyton Hewitt. He was easily defeated by the top seeded Hewitt, only able to win two games for the match. It was the second time he faced the world number one at their home Grand Slam, having lost to Pete Sampras in the 1997 US Open.

Challenger Titles

Singles: (1)

Doubles: (2)

References

1974 births
Living people
Australian male tennis players
Tennis people from the Australian Capital Territory
20th-century Australian people